Porgy may refer to:

 Porgy (novel), a 1925 novel by DuBose Heyward
 Porgy (play), a 1927 play by Dorothy Heyward and DuBose Heyward, based upon his 1925 novel
 Porgy (fish), a common name for fishes in the family Sparidae
 Porgy Key, a small island in the Florida Keys
 Porgy (album)

See also 
 Porgy and Bess (disambiguation)
 Georgy Porgy (disambiguation)